The thoracic spinal nerve 2 (T2) is a spinal nerve of the thoracic segment.

It originates from the spinal column from below the thoracic vertebra 2 (T2).

References

Spinal nerves